Philip Gough is a guitarist, singer-songwriter, film score composer, music producer and engineer. Phil has played in the bands, Novacaine (1996–1997), Bow Wow Wow (1999–2009), English Beat (2014), Common Sense (2001–present). As a composer Gough has scored several films and television programs. Most notably writing the theme for Gene Simmons: Family Jewels.

Television
Gene Simmons Family Jewels – (Music composer: Title theme – 57 episodes – 2006–2009)
Female Forces (TV series – Music composer – 2008)

Filmography
Red Meat (Music composer: additional music – 1997)
Face the Music (Music composer – 2000)
Cement (Music composer: additional music – 2000)
Auto Focus (Music composer: additional music – 2002)
The Revolting Dead (Music composer: additional music – 2003)
Yeti Vengeance (Music composer – 2004)
Funny Money (composer: additional music – 2008)
The Wild and Wonderful Whites of West Virginia (composer: additional music – 2009)

References

External links

 
 L.A.Times, Dave Wakeling, 1991

Year of birth missing (living people)
Living people
American rock guitarists
American male guitarists
American singer-songwriters
American male singer-songwriters
American rock songwriters
American rock singers
American film score composers
American male film score composers